Sheikh Salahuddin (born 29 August 1956) is a Muhajir Pakistani politician who had been a member of the National Assembly of Pakistan, from 2008 to May 2018.

Early life
He was born on 29 August 1956.

Political career

He was elected to the National Assembly of Pakistan as a candidate of Muttahida Qaumi Movement (MQM) from Constituency NA-244 (Karachi-VI) in 2008 Pakistani general election. He received 174,044 votes and defeated Mir Wali, a candidate of Muttahida Majlis-e-Amal (MMA).

He was re-elected to the National Assembly as a candidate of MQM from Constituency NA-244 (Karachi-VI) in 2013 Pakistani general election. He received 133,885 votes and defeated Khalid Masood Khan, a candidate of Pakistan Tehreek-e-Insaf (PTI).

References

Living people
Muhajir people
Pakistani MNAs 2008–2013
Pakistani MNAs 2013–2018
Politicians from Karachi
Muttahida Qaumi Movement MNAs
1956 births